Fauna of Bulgaria may refer to:
 List of birds of Bulgaria
 List of mammals of Bulgaria

See also
 Outline of Bulgaria